The Ministry of Trade and Export Development (Arabic: وزارة التجارة وتنمية الصادرات) is a department of the Government of Tunisia.

Ministers 

 Fadhila Rebhi (Bouden Cabinet) (October 11 , 2021 – January 6 , 2022)

References 

Government ministries of Tunisia
Tunisia